Valmiera Football Club or shortly Valmiera FC is a Latvian football club, playing in the Virslīga, the highest division of Latvian football. The club is based in the city of Valmiera. By winning the 2017 Latvian First League, the team was promoted to the 2018 Virslīga after a 14-year absence, and won their first title in 2022 Virslīga.

History
A predecessor of the club and the main team of the city of Valmiera from 1978 to 1993 was FK Gauja Valmiera, which won the final Football Championship of the Latvian SSR in 1990 and continued in the top flight after the restoration of the independence of Latvia. However, after the 1993 Virslīga season Gauja was relegated and slowly declined, disbanding in the mid-1990s while playing in the 2. līga.

The current club was founded in 1996 as Valmieras FK (Valmieras futbola klubs). It participated in the 1. līga (the second-highest division of Latvian football). The team finished second in the league which gave Valmiera the possibility to battle with the second from bottom team of the Higher League – Skonto-Metāls for a place in the top division of Latvian football. In the first game in Riga Skonto-Metāls won 1:0, but at home Valmiera overcame the one goal deficit and won 2:0 (I. Maļukovs, Dz. Savaļnieks), thus earning a place in the Virslīga.

In its debut season in the Virslīga Valmiera managed to finish 7th out of 9 teams with a comfortable margin over the two weakest teams. The following season was even more successful as the team finished 5th in Virslīga, and the same result was repeated in 1999. The new millennium brought financial difficulties for FK Valmiera. After the 2003 season the team had to leave the Virslīga because of financial difficulties and since then played in the 1. līga, paying more attention to developing young talent.

Several of former Valmiera players have played in the Latvia national football team. Those include Vīts Rimkus, Viktors Morozs, Gatis Kalniņš, Deniss Romanovs and Māris Smirnovs.

For more than ten years Valmiera was a mid level team in the 1. līga. Since 2010, under manager Gatis Ērglis a number of young local players experienced rapid development and the team became one of the leaders of the 1. līga.  In 2016 the sports organisation was established as "SO Valmiera Glass / Vidzemes Augstskola" or "Valmiera Glass ViA" - taking the name of the team's long-time sponsor Valmiera Fiberglass and Vidzeme University, which inherited the legacy of Valmiera football. Also joining Valmiera Glass ViA was the school's basketball club. In 2017 the team's best scorers were Alvis Dubovs and Niks Savaļnieks, helping Valmiera Glass ViA to win the Latvian First League with a ten-point margin.

In 2018, Valmiera Glass ViA returned to the Virslīga. One of the biggest offseason deals for the team was the return of Gatis Kalniņš to his hometown, but the veteran striker was mostly sidelined due to injuries. The team struggled in amidst fierce competition and earned only one point in the first ten rounds of the league. That led to the decision to replace long time manager Ērglis with Ukrainian coach Mykola Trubachov. In 2019, he was replaced by Georgian coach Tamaz Pertia.

In 2020 club was renamed to "Valmiera FC" (Valmiera Football Club), reportedly due to Valmiera Fibreglass entering a legal protection process due to financial difficulties.

In 2022, Valmiera won the Latvian top tier league for the first time in history.

Honours
Latvian Higher League
Champions: 2022

League and Cup history
FK Valmiera / Valmiera Glass ViA / Valmiera FC

European record

As of match played 28 July 2022

Notes
 QR: Qualifying round

Players

Current squad

Out on loan

References

External links 

Official website

 
Valmiera
Football clubs in Latvia
Association football clubs established in 1996
1996 establishments in Latvia